Robert Courtleigh (October 23, 1916 – November 21, 2004) was an American television and film actor.

Biography
He was born in Rye, New York, one of four sons born to Edna (Conroy) Courtleigh, a Gibson Girl, and William Courtleigh, a Canadian-born acclaimed Broadway actor, member of the Lamb's Club, and co-creator of the Actors' Equity Association.

Courtleigh got his start in the 1950s science fiction television series Atom Squad playing character Steve Elliott alongside Bob Hastings and Bram Nossem.  This role led to Courtleigh being chosen as an honorary delegate to the ninth annual World Science Fiction Convention held in Philadelphia, Pennsylvania. Among Courtleigh's other television roles were an episode of Men into Space in the 1960s, the part of the evil stepmother's groom in Rodgers and Hammerstein's Cinderella, a CBS TV special starring Lesley Ann Warren; several appearances in Hallmark Hall of Fame productions; and supporting roles in the Sylvester Stallone drama F.I.S.T. and Winter Kills, a John Huston thriller.

On March 15, 2022 it was confirmed on the MASH matters pod cast that Courtleigh played the role of General Douglas McArthur in the M*A*S*H episode 'Big Mac'

Courtleigh was preceded in death by his wife, Gretchen (who died in February 2004); they each had a child from previous marriages. Courtleigh's brother, Stephen, and half-brother, William, were also actors.

Film and television

References

External links 
 

1916 births
2004 deaths
American male film actors
American male television actors
20th-century American male actors
Male actors from New York (state)